Lui Chi Hing (born 10 January 1984) is a former Hong Kong professional footballer.   He is currently the assistant coach of Hong Kong Premier League club Tai Po.

Honours
Tai Po
Hong Kong Third District Division League: 2003–04
Hong Kong FA Cup: 2008–09
Hong Kong Senior Challenge Shield: 2012–13
Hong Kong Sapling Cup: 2016–17

References

1984 births
Living people
Hong Kong footballers
Association football defenders
Association football midfielders
Tai Po FC players
Hong Kong Premier League players
Hong Kong First Division League players